Thomas Pratt may refer to:

 Tame Parata (1837–1917), Māori Member of Parliament in New Zealand, also known under his European name Thomas Pratt
 Thomas Pratt (artist), also known as "Kneon", American comic-book artist
 Thomas Pratt (Maryland politician) (1804–1869), American lawyer and politician; governor of Maryland, 1845–1848 and U.S. Senator, 1850–1857
 Thomas Pratt (film editor) (1898–1973), American film editor
 Thomas Simson Pratt (1797–1879), British Army general
 Thomas Willis Pratt (1812–1875), American engineer
 Tom Pratt (baseball) (1844–1908), professional baseball player for the Philadelphia Athletics
 Tom Pratt (American football) (born 1935), American football coach
 Tom Pratt (footballer, born 1873) (1873–1935), English footballer
 Tom Pratt (footballer, born 1995), English footballer
 Tommy Pratt (1905–1992), Australian footballer